Rio is an unincorporated community and census-designated place in Albemarle County, Virginia. It is directly northeast of Charlottesville.

The population at the 2020 census was 2,076.

References

Unincorporated communities in Virginia
Unincorporated communities in Albemarle County, Virginia